A sweet tooth is a fondness or craving for sweet foods.  

Sweet Tooth may also refer to:

Biology
 The "sweet tooth" behavioral phenotype (i.e., a fondness or craving for sweet foods), caused by a single nucleotide polymorphism of the FGF21 gene

Fictional characters 
 Sweet Tooth, a character in the video game series Twisted Metal
 Sweet Tooth, A villain in the 1977 animated TV series The New Adventures of Batman
 Sweet-Tooth Jangala, a character in the PlayStation 2 port of the 2008 racing video game Speed Racer: The Videogame
 Sweet Tooth, A villain in the 2012 musical Holy Musical B@man!
 Dr. Sweet Tooth, a character in The 7D
 Sweet Tooth, a character in the defunct online MMPORG game Moshi Monsters

Literature 
 Sweet Tooth (comics), a comic strip in the British comic Whizzer and Chips
 A 1989 story by Lin Carter
 Sweet Tooth (novel), a 2012 novel by Ian McEwan
 Sweet Tooth (Vertigo), an American comic book limited series by Jeff Lemire
 Sweet Tooth (TV series), an American  fantasy drama series based on the comic book

Music 
 Halloween: Sweet Tooth, a 2007 album in the Halloween series by Mannheim Steamroller
 Sweet Tooth, a 1990s British band that included Justin Broadrick
 Sweet Tooth, a 2007 album by The Electric Confectionaires
 "Sweet Tooth", a song by the band Free from Tons of Sobs
 "Sweet Tooth", a song by Marilyn Manson from Portrait of an American Family
 "Sweet Tooth", a song by Raheem DeVaughn from The Love Experience
 "Sweet Tooth", a song by Cavetown from Sleepyhead
Sweet Tooth, a 2022 album by Odanak musician Mali Obomsawin

Other uses 
 Sweet Tooth, an American thoroughbred racehorse named 1977 Kentucky Broodmare of the Year
 Sweet Tooth, a strain of Cannabis that won the 2001 Cannabis Cup